Rocky Rajesh (born as Rajesh) is an Indian  fight master/action choreographer, mainly in Kollywood. He did the stunts for Khokababu The Hindu said that his stunt work in the film Daas "looks so dangerous that it is ludicrous when the hero escapes with bruises." and that his work for Vallarasu was one of the assets of the film. He has worked with actor Vijayakanth in many films. Stunt masters and Actors like Ponnambalam, Ram Laxman, Thavasiraj, Vicky, Ghilli Sekar and Rajesh Kanna have worked as fighters and assistants to him. His son Thamizh is an actor who made his debut in the film Aimbulan

Filmography

Fight Master
Films
 1991 Moondrezhuthil En Moochirukkum 
 1992 Chinna Gounder 
 1992 Bharathan 
 1992 Chembaruthi 
 1992 Thai Mozhi 
 1992 Pangali 
 1993 Kovil Kaalai 
 1993 Yejaman 
 1993 Ezhai Jaathi 
 1993 Enga Thambi 
 1993 Ponnumani 
 1993 Sakkarai Devan 
 1993 Rajadurai 
 1993 Enga Muthalali 
 1993 Sendhoorapandi 
 1994 Sethupathi IPS 
 1994 Honest Raj 
 1994 Duet 
 1994 Pathavi Pramanam 
 1994 Senthamizh Selvan 
 1994 En Aasai Machan 
 1994 Sathyavan
 1994 Periya Marudhu 
 1995 Karuppu Nila 
 1995 Thirumoorthy 
 1995 Rani Maharani
 1995 Gandhi Pirantha Mann 
 1995 Raasaiyya 
 1996 Thayagam 
 1996 Aavathum Pennale Azhivathum Pennale
 1996 Tamizh Selvan 
 1996 Priyam
 1996 Alexander 
 1997 Dharma Chakkaram
 1997 Gopura Deepam
 1997 Vaimaye Vellum 
 1997 Mannava
 1997 Vivasaayi Magan
 1997 Dhinamum Ennai Gavani
 1997 Pagaivan 
 1997 Arasiyal 
 1998 Ulavuthurai 
 1998 Kadhal Mannan 
 1998 Harichandra 
 1998 Sandhippoma
 1998 Dharma  
 1998 Poonthottam 
 1998 Kalyana Galatta 
 1998 Aasai Thambi
 1998 Veeram Vilanja Mannu 
 1999 Suriya Paarvai 
 1999 Kallazhagar 
 1999 Ethirum Pudhirum 
 1999 Periyanna 
 1999 Kannupada Poguthaiya
 1999 Azhagarsamy  
 2000 Vanathai Pola 
 2000 Vallarasu 
 2000 James Pandu
 2000 Simmasanam 
 2000 Kannukku Kannaga 
 2000 Anbudan 
 2001 Vaanchinathan 
 2001 Dhill 
 2001 Narasimha 
 2002 Game
 2003 Dhool 
 2003 Chokka Thangam 
 2003 Vaseegara 
 2003 Thennavan  
 2004 Engal Anna 
 2004 Jai 
 2004 Campus
 2004 Ghilli 
 2004 Arasatchi 
 2004 Gajendra 
 2004 Neranja Manasu 
 2005 Thirupaachi 
 2005 Daas 
 2005 Sivakasi 
 2005 Aaru
 2006 Aathi
 2006 Sudesi 
 2006 Perarasu 
 2006 Dharmapuri 
 2006 Thiruvilaiyaadal Aarambam 
 2007 Thaamirabharani 
 2007 Sabari 
 2007 Madurai Veeran
 2007 Vel 
 2008 Kuruvi 
 2008 Arasangam 
 2008 Pattaya Kelappu
 2008 Seval 
 2008 Mahesh, Saranya Matrum Palar 
 2009 Mariyadhai 
 2009 Thoranai 
 2009 Engal Aasan 
 2009 Azhagar Malai
 2009 Thamizhagam
 2010 Aimbulan 
 2010 Kanagavel Kaaka 
 2010 Singam 
 2010 Thillalangadi 
 2010 Virudhagiri 
 2011 Ilaignan 
 2011 Mambattiyan 
 2012 Aravaan 
 2013 Singam II
 2015 Pulan Visaranai 2
 2015 Sagaptham
 2015 Strawberry
 2018 En Sangathu Aala Adichavan Evanda
 2019 Ottradal
 2020 Kadamaan Paarai
Television
 2018 Chandrakumari

Actor
 1993 Enga Thambi as Rocky Rajesh (in a special appearance as a Henchman)
 1998 Kalyana Galatta as Henchman (special appearance)
 1999 Kallazhagar as Thief (special appearance)
 1999 Periyanna as Henchman (special appearance)
 2000 James Pandu as Referee (special appearance)
 2004 Gajendra as Henchman 
 2005 Maayavi as Himself (special appearance)
 2006 Aadhi as Thappu Player (special appearance)
 2006 Dharmapuri as Police Commissioner (special appearance)
 2008 Suryaa as Raja (special appearance)
 2009 Thamizhagam as Police Inspector

Awards
Won
 1992 Tamil Nadu State Film Award for Best Stunt Coordinator - Chinna Gounder & Chembaruthi
 1994 Tamil Nadu State Film Award for Best Stunt Coordinator - Honest Raj
 1997 Cinema Express Award for Best Stunt Master - Dharma Chakkaram
Nominated
 2013 South Indian International Movie Awards for Best Fight Choreographer  - Singam II
 2013 Vijay Award for Best Stunt Director - Singam II

External links

References 

Living people
Male actors from Tamil Nadu
Tamil male actors
Indian action choreographers
20th-century Indian male actors
21st-century Indian male actors
1961 births